A by-election was held for the New South Wales Legislative Assembly electorate of Heathcote on 31 January 1987 following the resignation of sitting Labor party member Rex Jackson amidst a corruption scandal that ultimately led to his imprisonment. Jackson was facing conspiracy charges arising from his role as Minister for Corrective Services and Jackson resigned so that he could use his superannuation payout to meet his legal costs, where the government has ceased paying those costs in March 1985. Jackson said "The Government's put me in a position where I've got no choice. What the Labor Party has done to me is absolutely outrageous". The Labor government delayed the by-election as long as possible, arguing that it was not possible to hold an election during Jackson's trial or while Parliament was sitting. The Leader of the Opposition, Nick Greiner, rejected this argument, declaring that the election was only delayed in an attempt to allow any bad press from the corruption trial to die down. The election finally came on 31 January 1987, and was rarely short of drama: Jackson, with criminal charges hanging over his head, entered as a spoiler candidate; the Liberals found themselves in hot water over an illegally large billboard prominently placed on the electorate's border over the Princes Highway; and the ALP were accused of sabotage after vandals cut loose from its moorings a Liberal advertising blimp.

The Heathcote by-election was held the same day as the Bankstown by-election.

Dates

Results

Labor party member Rex Jackson resigned.

See also
Electoral results for the district of Heathcote
List of New South Wales state by-elections

Notes

References 

1987 elections in Australia
New South Wales state by-elections
1980s in New South Wales